Delaware Stadium is a 18,800-seat multi-purpose stadium in Newark, Delaware, and is home to the University of Delaware Fightin' Blue Hens football team.  The stadium is part of the David M. Nelson Athletic Complex, which includes the Bob Carpenter Center, Fred P. Rullo Stadium, the Fred Rust Ice Arena and the Delaware Field House.

History
Delaware Stadium opened on November 15, 1952, with the Blue Hens defeating Lafayette 13–12.  Delaware Stadium has expanded with the growth of the university, with seating expansions in 1964, 1970, 1972, and 1975.  Upgrades to the seating and facilities were made in 1992–93, along with a resurfacing of the field and reconstruction of the drainage and irrigation systems.  Prior to the 2000 season, the university installed permanent lighting at the stadium, consisting of eight stanchions casting broadcast quality light.  The first night game in Delaware Stadium history was played against The Citadel on September 9, 2000, with 22,075 in attendance.

The Blue Hens have been among the attendance leaders in I-AA/FCS for over 30 years, with a fan base as loyal as those of major FBS teams.  For a typical Blue Hen home game, Delaware Stadium becomes the fourth-largest city in the state (behind Wilmington, Dover and Newark itself).  Average attendance for the 2006 season was 21,825; second only to the University of Montana.  By comparison, most FCS teams attract 10,000 on a good day.  Delaware is the only
NCAA FCS team in the nation to average 20,000 or more fans per regular season home game from 1999 to 2010.  The largest Delaware Stadium crowd was the standing-room only crowd of 23,719 that watched the Blue Hens host Temple, October 27, 1973.

On August 29, 2002, the field was dedicated as Tubby Raymond Field, in honor of longtime Blue Hen Football coach Harold "Tubby" Raymond.

The stadium has hosted the Division I NCAA Men's Lacrosse Championship in 1984 and 1986, and two NCAA men's lacrosse tournament first-round games in May 2002.

Renovations
The stadium underwent another renovation in mid-2008 with the addition of a  HD video board and a high-fidelity, 20 kilowatt audio system. A video control room was added inside the Bob Carpenter Center.

In early September 2009, six 20- by 30-foot posters were added to the facade of the stadium, featuring past stars of Delaware football. The first six posters added were Joe Flacco, Eddie Conti, Daryl Brown, Chuck Hall, Conway Hayman, and Rich Gannon. Photos of more than 40 stars of years past were submitted to Sports Graphics of Indianapolis, Indiana and will be rotated throughout the stadium at different times. A "Wall of Champions" banner that lists accomplishments of the Fightin' Blue Hens was also added as part of the visual upgrade of the facility.

From December 2009 to January 2010 the grass field was replaced with new FieldTurf artificial surface.

The stands underwent more improvements in the summer of 2011. Hand rails were added along each aisle of the east and west grandstands.

Present day
The current stadium configuration has concrete grandstands on the east and west sides, with the press box on the top of the west grandstand, and permanent metal bleachers on the north and south end zones.  Behind the north end zone there is the scoreboard with a video screen used to show replays and other videos. The Delaware football team enters the field from the tunnel beneath the south end zone bleachers, which are reserved for student seating and the marching band. 

The "Cockpit" is the nickname of the University of Delaware's student section at home football games located behind the south end zone. At 22,000, Delaware Stadium has the 2nd highest seating capacity in the CAA.

Delaware Stadium is also the venue for the annual commencement ceremonies for graduating seniors and graduate students in May. 

On June 6, 2010, plans for stadium renovations were unveiled by University President Patrick Harker. The new plans unveiled include adding luxury suites to the stadium, an additional 8,200 seats overall (which would have increased seating to over 30,000 seats), a  performance center, a club lounge, and new facilities for TV and radio.  However, these plans never materialized.

In November 2018, it was announced that, as part of a $60 million campaign, a new athletic training center would be built and Delaware Stadium would be renovated. Improvements to the stadium will include upgrading the west (home) stands (including more chair-back seating), a new press box and enhanced restrooms and concessions. Construction on this project is currently in progress. The new seating areas were completed on time for the Delaware season opener August 29, 2019; however the press box, club level, and concessions were not. Temporary press boxes were built on the east stands for use during the entire 2019 season, along with temporary restroom and concession facilities. The Stadium renovations and Whitney Athletic center have been completed as of December 2020. A new video board will be installed for the 2023 season.  Delaware is expected to soon announce a fund-raising project to construct an $80 million building with offices and indoor practice facilities at the north end of Delaware Stadium instead of a previously planned Field House restoration.

Attendance records

Delaware football records at Delaware Stadium

See also
 Frazer Field
 Wilmington Park
 List of NCAA Division I FCS football stadiums

References

External links
University of Delaware Athletics: Tubby Raymond Field at Delaware Stadium
Interactive Map Of FCS College Football Stadiums: Click on the Delaware Logo to get a satellite view & directions to the stadium

Sports venues completed in 1952
American football venues in Delaware
College football venues
College lacrosse venues in the United States
Delaware Fightin' Blue Hens football
NCAA Men's Division I Lacrosse Championship venues
Multi-purpose stadiums in the United States
Buildings and structures in Newark, Delaware
Tourist attractions in New Castle County, Delaware